Aplotelia is a genus of moths of the family Euteliidae. The genus was described by Warren in 1914.

Species
Aplotelia diplographa (Hampson, 1905) north-eastern Himalayas, Peninsular Malaysia, Sumatra, Borneo
Aplotelia nubilosa Warren, 1914 Peninsular Malaysia, Sumatra, Borneo, Philippines
Aplotelia oetakwa Holloway, 1985 New Guinea
Aplotelia tripartita (Semper, 1900) New Guinea, Philippines, Solomons

References

Euteliinae
Noctuoidea genera